Reza John Borchardt (born June 2, 1997 ), who goes by the mononymic stage name Reza Illusionist, is an American magician from Brookings, South Dakota.

Early life 
Reza’s interest in magic began at the age of 6, when he saw a magic show at Hillcrest Elementary School in Brookings. At 7 years old, he asked for a magic kit for his birthday and put on performances at his school.

Performances 
At 15 years old, Reza left Brookings for Branson, Missouri. Initially, he performed 18 shows per week for 6 weeks. Since that time, he has performed hundreds of shows in the town, and was voted Branson's Magician of the Year in 2016 & 2021.

In 2013, Reza announced 45 shows at the Mundo Imperial Forum in Acapulco, Mexico, He has been described as "the nation's top touring illusionist" and "one of the fastest rising young stars in the country" by the Brookings Register. From April 2014 until August 2015, Reza was a member of The Revollusionists, a spinoff show from The Illusionists, and in 2015, the Starlite Theater in Branson announced that Reza’s show, Edge of Illusion, would be open from March until September 2016. According to the theater, who Reza performed for on his 100th show in Branson, "His stage props are the largest in town, and his act is engaging, enthralling and infused with humor and charm ... Edge of Illusion highlights the new age of magic and misdirection with sleek, seamless fun and a fresh take on all things ordinary. Reza currently performs at Branson’s Famous Theatre.   In 2018, Reza performed on the television show Penn & Teller: Fool Us. Although he did not win the competition that season, Reza nevertheless earned praise from Penn, who proclaimed the performance “an amazing trick!”

Reza tours the United States, redeveloping his show as he does so. Reza claims that a lot of what he performs is inspired by music, movies and pop culture.

Other work 
Reza has done a number of fundraisers for charity. In 2010, Reza partnered with the Brookings Red Cross chapter in order to stage a benefit show for the organization, and August 2015 he teamed up with the charitable organization Star of Hope to make Hunger Vanish, in a campaign to provide 640,000 school lunches for Haitian children.

In 2013, Reza appeared on MTV alongside Never Shout Never. More recently, in 2016 Reza appeared on a 1 hour episode of the popular Japanese TV Show, Sekai No Hatte Madde Itte Q, and in 2017, Reza appeared on Duck Dynasty.

References 

Living people
American magicians
1997 births